Splicing factor 1 also known as zinc finger protein 162 (ZFM162) is a protein that in humans is encoded by the SF1 gene.

Splicing factor SF1 is involved in the ATP-dependent formation of the spliceosome complex. SF1 gene is necessary to make the bipotential gonad ; but while SF1 levels decline in the genital ridge of XX mouse embryos, the SF1 gene stays on the developing testes. SF 1 (transcription factor) appears to be active in masculining both the Leydig cells and Sertoli cells. In Sertoli cells with the SOX9 protein it elevates the level of AMH transcription. In Leydig cells it activates the gene encoding the enzyme that make testosterone hormone.

Interactions
SF1 (gene) has been shown to interact with Ewing sarcoma breakpoint region 1, U2AF2, Testis determining factor, and Transcription elongation regulator 1.

References

Further reading